Turneria frenchi is a species of ant in the genus Turneria. Described by Forel in 1911, it is endemic to Australia, but original specimens of the ant have been lost, and its placement in a genus has been in question. The ant has been transferred various times, notably being transferred to Stigmacros in 1990 but then put back into Turneria in 1992.

References

Dolichoderinae
Insects described in 1911
Hymenoptera of Australia